Eye Against Eye is a book of poetry by the American poet Forrest Gander published in 2005. It includes ten photographs by Sally Mann, for which Gander has written accompaniment pieces. It is divided into sections, and includes the following:

Contents

Poem

Burning Towers, Standing Wall
Burning Towers, Standing Wall (Tabasco Province, Mexico)
(also featured in The Blue Rock Collection [Salt Editions, 2004-05])
Ligature
(commissioned by Sam Truitt and featured, with the sculpture of Douglas Culhane, in the exhibition Magnitude: Words in Sculpture, Rubenstein Gallery, New York, NY, 2001; also featured in First Intensity [2002])

Present Tense
Present Tense
(also featured in Crowd, Spring 2005)
Ligature 2

Late Summer Entry - The Landscapes of Sally Mann
(also featured in Conjunctions issue 32, 1999, and issue 37, 2001)
River and Trees
Photo Canto
Ghost Sonata
Road and Tree
Science & Steepleflower
Collodion
Ivy Brick Wall
Argosy for Rock and Grass
Bridge & Swimmer
The Broken Tower
Late Summer Entry
Ligature 3
(commissioned by Sam Truitt and featured, with the sculpture of Douglas Culhane, in the exhibition Magnitude: Words in Sculpture, Rubenstein Gallery, New York, NY, 2001; also featured in First Intensity [2002])

Mission Thief
Mission Thief
(also featured in Conjunctions, Spring 2005)
Ligature 4

American poetry collections
2005 poetry books
New Directions Publishing books